Eidsbygda is a village in Rauma Municipality in Møre og Romsdal county, Norway. This village was the administrative center of the old municipality pf Eid. Eid Church is located in the eastern part of Eidsbygda.

References

Rauma, Norway
Villages in Møre og Romsdal